The Ninety Mile Beach Marine National Park is a protected marine national park in situated off the Gippsland coast in eastern Victoria, Australia.

See also

 Protected areas of Victoria

References

External links

Ramsar sites in Australia
Marine parks in Victoria (Australia)
East Gippsland
Coastline of Victoria (Australia)
Protected areas of Bass Strait